Sadakazu (written: 禎一, 貞一 or 貞和) is a masculine Japanese given name. Notable people with the name include:

, Japanese poet and scholar of Japanese literature
, Japanese politician
, Japanese jujutsuka

Japanese masculine given names